Merab Ninidze (born 3 November 1965) is a Georgian actor. In the English-speaking world, he is best known for the roles of Walter Redlich in Nowhere in Africa and Oleg Penkovsky in The Courier.

Career

Early career 
Merab Ninidze was born on 3 November 1965 in Tbilisi, Georgian SSR, USSR. He grew up in an artistic family. His grandmother, Zeinab Ghoghoberidze, was a music teacher and introduced him to music, and he then went on to study classical music for seven years. His grandfather, Sergo Akhaladze, was a theatre director, and Ninidze was involved in theatre from a very young age. From 1972 to 1982 he attended Tbilisi Classical Gymnasium.

At the age of thirteen, Ninidze auditioned for the part of Prince Edward in Shakespeare's Richard III at Rustaveli State Academic Theater in Tbilisi, which was directed by Robert Sturua and premiered in 1979. The production had great success, touring the UK three times, taking part in Edinburgh Festival, Glasgow Mayfest and The Roundhouse in London. From 1982 to 1985 he studied acting at the Shota Rustaveli Theater and Georgia State Film University under the tutelage of Gizo Jordania, which led to him becoming a full-time member of the Shota Rustaveli Theatre Company. Also, he had successful collaborations in many of Jordania's later productions, such as The Diary of Anne Frank in 1989, David Kldiashvili’s Step-Mother in 1989 (which toured the UK in 1989–1990) and Hamlet in 1992. After Hamlet premiered in 1992, Civil War broke out in Georgia leading to his emigration, and he only returned to the theater's stage playing Shylock in The Merchant of Venice in 2003 (dir. Levan Tsuladze). He also took part in Georg Büchner’s Leonce and Lena (dir. Nana Kvaskhvadze) in 1991.

Ninidze's first film role was in Tengiz Abuladze’s 1984 film Repentance, which won three prizes at the 40th Cannes Film Festival, including the Grand Prize of the Jury. Since then he has appeared in films by many Georgian directors. As the Civil War broke out in Georgia, he was offered the opportunity to work with Austrian director Goran Rebic. He spent several months in Vienna playing a Serbian war survivor in Rebic’s film Yugofilm, which subsequently led to his emigration at the age of 25.

Later career 
For the last 20 years, Ninidze has been actively portraying characters in English, Russian, and German language films and TV series. He has appeared in numerous German films by various directors. Nowhere in Africa (dir. Caroline Link), with Ninidze as lead, was awarded an Academy Award for Best Foreign Language Film in 2002. Ninidze has received several European and Russian film prizes, and films in which he has participated are shown regularly at major film festivals. Throughout his career, he has also been active in Russian cinema and TV, landing major roles in Aleksei German’s Paper Soldier and Under Electric Clouds, Bakhtyar Khudojnazarov’s Luna Papa, and others. His recent credits in TV series include Berlin Station in 2015, BBC’s McMafia in 2018 (dir. by James Watkins), and Homeland (2018). In 2017 he attended the Berlinale Film Festival for two of his most recent Georgian films – Hostages (dir. Rezo Gigineishvili) and My Happy Family (dir. Nana Ekvtimishvili and Simon Gross), which also won prizes in various film festivals around the world. In May 2017, theatre and film director Kornel Mundruczo’s film Jupiter’s Moon was shown in the main competition at Cannes Film Festival. In September 2017, Ninidze won the Best Actor award at the Batumi International Film Festival for his role in Jupiter’s Moon.

Personal life
Ninidze's autobiographical novel Everywhere, even in Africa was published in 2015.

Filmography

References

External links
 
Official website
Merab Ninidze Intelekti 

1965 births
Living people
Actors from Tbilisi
Male stage actors from Georgia (country)
Male film actors from Georgia (country)
20th-century male actors from Georgia (country)
21st-century male actors from Georgia (country)
Asia Pacific Screen Award winners